Columbus County Schools is a PK–12 graded school district serving Columbus County, North Carolina. Its 17 schools serve 5,673 students according to the August Average Daily Membership during 2018–19 school year.

Student demographics
For the 2016–17 school year, Columbus County Schools had a total population of 5357 students and 398 teachers on a (FTE) basis.  That same year, out of the student total, the gender ratio was 49.54% female to 50.46% male. The demographic group makeup was: Black, 29.9%; White, 52.65%; Hispanic, 10.11%; American Indian, 5.08%; and Asian/Pacific Islander, 0% (two or more races: 2.2%%). For the same school year, 59.88% were economically disadvantaged.

Governance
The primary governing body of Columbus County Schools follows a council–manager government format with a five-member Board of Education appointing a Superintendent to run the day-to-day operations of the system. The school system currently resides in the North Carolina State Board of Education's Fourth District.

Board of Education
The five members of the Board of Education are: Monte Herring (Term Expires 2022), Ronnie Strickland (Term Expires 2022), Junior Dew (Term Expires 2020), Randy Coleman (Term Expires 2020), and Worley T. Edwards (Term Expires 2022).

Superintendent
The current superintendent of the system is Deanne Meadows. She was named as superintendent starting July 1, 2019. The previous superintendent was Alan Faulk. He became superintendent in May 2011, and retired in October 2018. Faulk replaced Dan Strickland who retired from the system to take a position in Marion County, South Carolina.

Member schools
Columbus County Schools has 17 schools ranging from pre-kindergarten to twelfth grade. Those 17 schools are separated into four high schools, four middle schools, and nine elementary schools.

High schools
 East Columbus High School (Lake Waccamaw)
 South Columbus High School (Tabor City)
 Southeastern Early College; also called Columbus Career and College Academy (Whiteville)
 West Columbus High School (Cerro Gordo)

Middle schools
 Acme Delco Middle School (Delco)
 Hallsboro Middle School (Hallsboro)
 Nakina Middle School (Nakina)
 Tabor City Middle School (Tabor City)

Elementary schools
 Acme Delco Elementary School (Reigelwood)
 Cerro Gordo Elementary School; grades PK–8 (Cerro Gordo)
 Chadbourn Elementary School (Chadbourn)
 Evergreen Elementary School; grades PK–8 (Evergreen)
 Guideway Elementary School (Tabor City)
 Hallsboro-Artesia Elementary School (Hallsboro)
 Old Dock Elementary School (Whiteville)
 Tabor City Elementary School (Tabor City)
 Williams Township School; grades PK–8 (Whiteville)

Athletics
According to the North Carolina High School Athletic Association, for the 2019–2020 school year:

East and West Columbus are 1A schools in the Three Rivers Conference.
South Columbus is a 2A school in Three Rivers Conference. 
CCCA does not support high school athletics.

Awards
Tabor City Middle School received the national American School Board Journal’s Magna Awards in 2011 based on their active REAL (Relevant, Engaging, Authentic Learning) program participation.

See also
List of school districts in North Carolina

References

External links
 

Education in Columbus County, North Carolina
School districts in North Carolina